Vsevolod Svyatoslavovich Zhuravlyov (born 27 December 1978) is a former Russian professional football player.

Zhuravlyov played in the Russian First Division with FC Lokomotiv Nizhny Novgorod and FC Metallurg-Kuzbass Novokuznetsk.

External links
 

1978 births
Living people
Russian footballers
Association football defenders
FC Dynamo Moscow reserves players
FC Lokomotiv Nizhny Novgorod players
Russian Premier League players
FC Novokuznetsk players
FC Spartak Nizhny Novgorod players